Eoderoceras is an evolute, round whorled ammonite from the Lower Jurassic with an outer row of distinct spines, and in some, an inner row of tubercles, on either side; ribs only on the inner whorls.

Eoderoceras, named by Leonard Spath in 1925, is the type genus for the family Eoderoceratidae to which it belongs, which is part of the ammonitid superfamily Eoderoceratoidea, ammonoid cephalopods distinct from the more conservative but more successful Nautiloidea still around today.

References

Arkell et al., 1957. Mesozoic Ammonoidea, in Treatise on Invertebrate Paleontology, (Part L); Geological Soc. of America and University of Kansas press
Donovan, Callomon and Howarth 1981 Classification of the Jurassic Ammonitina; Systematics Association. 

Early Jurassic ammonites of Europe
Sinemurian life
Fossil taxa described in 1925